The 267th Indian Tank Brigade was a short lived armoured brigade of the Indian Army during the Second World War.  It was reconstituted as 72nd Indian Infantry Brigade.

History
The brigade was formed on 3 July 1942 at Sialkot with three regiments of the Royal Armoured Corps.  These were infantry battalions of the British Army that were converted to an armoured role:
 116th Regiment Royal Armoured Corps formed on 24 July 1942 from 9th Battalion, Gordon Highlanders
 160th Regiment Royal Armoured Corps formed on 15 July 1942 from 9th Battalion, Royal Sussex Regiment in the United Kingdom
 163rd Regiment Royal Armoured Corps formed on 30 July 1942 from 13th Battalion, Sherwood Foresters
It moved to Secunderabad in October under the command of the 43rd Indian Armoured Division and then to Poona.  The brigade was intended for service in the Burma Campaign during the Second World War but in the event it never left India.  On 1 April 1943, it was reconstituted as the 72nd Indian Infantry Brigade.

Units
The brigade commanded the following units:
 116th Regiment Royal Armoured Corps (joined on 27 July 1942; left on 31 October 1942 for 255th Indian Armoured Brigade)
 163rd Regiment Royal Armoured Corps (joined on 30 July 1942; left on 31 March 1943 when it reverted to 13th Sherwood Foresters in 67th Indian Training Brigade)
 160th Regiment Royal Armoured Corps (joined on 22 December 1942; left on 1 April 1943 when it reverted to 9th Royal Sussex Regiment in 72nd Indian Infantry Brigade)
 267th Armoured Brigade Signals Squadron (1942 to 1943; became 72nd Indian Infantry Brigade Signals Section)
 111th Field Post Office (July 1942 to April 1943)

See also

 List of Indian Army Brigades in World War II

Notes

References

Bibliography

External links
 

Armoured brigades of the British Indian Army
Military units and formations established in 1942